Stephan Salger (born 30 January 1990) is a German professional footballer who plays as a defender for 1. FC Köln II.

Club career
Born in Düren, West Germany, Salger joined the youth system of 1. FC Köln in 2002. He made his debut for the club at the beginning of the 2010–11 season in a 3–1 defeat against 1. FC Kaiserslautern.

He had a spell on loan at VfL Osnabrück in the 2011–12 season, before signing for Arminia Bielefeld in 2012.

After eight years at Arminia Bielefeld, he joined 1860 Munich for an undisclosed fee in September 2020.

International career
On 16 November 2010, Salger earned his first cap for the Germany U21 team after coming on as a second-half substitute in the 2–0 win against England U21 in a friendly match.

References

External links
 
 

1990 births
Living people
German footballers
Association football defenders
Germany under-21 international footballers
1. FC Köln players
1. FC Köln II players
VfL Osnabrück players
Arminia Bielefeld players
TSV 1860 Munich players
Bundesliga players
2. Bundesliga players
3. Liga players
Regionalliga players
People from Düren
Sportspeople from Cologne (region)
Footballers from North Rhine-Westphalia